"Where You Lead" is a song written in 1970 by Carole King with lyricist Toni Stern, introduced on King's iconic 1971 album Tapestry. A Top 40 hit for Barbra Streisand in both a studio and a live version — the latter in a medley entitled "Sweet Inspiration/ Where You Lead'" — the song has also served as the main theme song for The WB dramedy series Gilmore Girls in a lyrically revised version recorded by King and Louise Goffin.

Original version
"Where You Lead" is one of two Carole King/ Toni Stern collaborations featured on Tapestry, the other being the #1 single "It's Too Late". King had written the music and the majority of the lyric for "Where You Lead" when she solicited the assistance of Stern, saying: "I can't write the bridge to this: if you can figure out the bridge you can get [co-writing] credit for the song." Disliking the arguably servile stance of the song as written by King so far, Stern swiftly conceived lyrics for its bridge which she felt expressed a more empowered narrative voice. The lyrics Stern submitted to King included the lines: "...if you want to live in fucking New York City / Honey you know I will": King herself deleted "fucking", then sought Tapestry producer Lou Adler's approval of the "New York City" reference; Adler's approval was forthcoming and the lyrics for "Where You Lead" were thus complete.

Inspired by the Book of Ruth, where it says:  "Where you go, I will go",  "Where You Lead" was described by Rolling Stone Magazine critic Jon Landau as an "ingratiatingly witty song that seems to parody the romantic extremes of some of Carole's earlier work." Landau also praises the power of Russ Kunkel's drumming on the song. Author James Perone states that a superficial reading of the lyrics could suggest that the song reinforces stereotypes that a woman should not put her desire for a career ahead of pleasing her husband.  But he goes on to say that the singer has actually made "an informed and empowered decision" to follow her man "because of the life changing impact" the relationship has had on her.

The 2008 "Legacy Edition" release of Tapestry coupled a remastered version of the Tapestry album with a second disc which featured live performances by King - from concerts in 1973 and 1976 - of all of the songs from Tapestry except for "Where You Lead", reflecting the fact that soon after the release of Tapestry King came to the realization that "Where You Lead" was somewhat politically incorrect and as a result stopped performing it live, only reinstating the song in her concert setlists following its 2000 lyrical revision (see Section 3 below).

Personnel
Carole King – piano, vocals

Additional musicians
Merry Clayton – background vocals
Danny "Kootch" Kortchmar – electric guitar
Russ Kunkel – drums
Charles "Charlie" Larkey – bass guitar
Ralph Schuckett – electric piano
Julia Tillman – background vocals

Barbra Streisand versions

Barbra Joan Streisand album track

Barbra Streisand recorded "Where You Lead" in a 21 April 1971 session which would yield seven tracks featured on the August 1971 album release Barbra Joan Streisand, which album would include a total of three covers of Tapestry tracks: "Where You Lead", "Beautiful", and "You've Got a Friend".

On "Where You Lead" Streisand had the backing of the all-female band Fanny augmented by Billy Preston on organ and disc producer Richard Perry on tambourine: Fanny - who arranged the track - also served as chorale, augmented by Clydie King, Venetta Fields, and Oma Drake. Issued as advance single in June 1971, "Where You Lead" just reached Top 40 hit status, #40 being its peak on the Billboard Hot 100.

The 1979 compilation Barbra Streisand's Greatest Hits Vol. 2 included "Sweet Inspiration/ Where You Lead", while Streisand's studio version of "Where You Lead" was the singer's only Top 40 hit of the relevant time period to be excluded.

Sweet Inspiration/ Where You Lead live medley

The 1972 concert album release Live Concert at the Forum - a recording of Streisand's 15 April 1972 Four for McGovern concert at The Forum (Inglewood CA) - featured "Where You Lead" in a medley entitled "Sweet Inspiration/ Where You Lead", Streisand's Forum concert having featured her performance of "Where You Lead" in tandem with "Sweet Inspiration", the latter being a Dan Penn/ Spooner Oldham composition written for and first recorded in 1967 by the Sweet Inspirations for whom it had afforded a Top 20 hit reaching #18 on the Billboard Hot 100 in the spring of 1968.

Streisand had premiered the "Sweet Inspiration/ Where You Lead" medley during her 24 December 1971 — 14 January 1972 Las Vegas engagement at the International Hotel, the number having been designed by the hotel's musical director Joe Guercio: Guercio had an especial awareness of the song "Sweet Inspiration" as he had begun his seven year tenure as bandleader for Elvis Presley in January 1970, and as Presley's bandleader Guercio worked closely with the Sweet Inspirations who served as Presley's concert chorale and also his opening act.

"Sweet Inspiration/ Where You Lead" was released 25 May 1972 as the first advance single from the Live Concert at the Forum (the album would be released October 1972): a left-field choice for single release due to its six minute playing time  - also in that Streisand's studio take on "Where You Lead" had been her last-but-two single release with neither interim single proving high-profile - , "Sweet Inspiration/ Where You Lead" would approximate the chart impact of the "Where You Lead" single off Barbra Joan Streisand, as the "Sweet Inspiration/ Where You Lead" single peaked at #37 on the Top 40.

Streisand would perform "Sweet Inspiration/ Where You Lead" on her Barbra Streisand...and Other Musical Instruments television special which was taped at Elstree Studios in the summer of 1973 and broadcast that 2 November: with Ray Charles on piano and the Raelettes as chorale, Streisand performed an abbreviated version of the medley which ran roughly half the time of the single edit of the Live Concert at the Forum version.

The 1979 compilation Barbra Streisand's Greatest Hits Vol. 2 included "Sweet Inspiration/ Where You Lead", while Streisand's studio version of "Where You Lead" was the singer's only Top 40 hit of the relevant time period to be excluded.

Charts

Carole King/Louise Goffin duet version

Asked by series creator Amy Sherman-Palladino for permission to use the original Tapestry track as the Gilmore Girls theme, King had responded that she'd rather re-record the song for Sherman-Palladino's purpose, with lyrics abridged to reflect the series' theme of a mother-daughter relationship and with King's own daughter Louise Goffin dueting with King. King contacted Toni Stern, co-writer of the song's original version, and Stern tweaked the song's original romantic lyrics so as to be applicable to a mother-daughter relationship, and King and Goffin recorded this new version of "Where You Lead" at the home studio in the Laurel Canyon residence of Goffin and Goffin's then-husband Greg Wells with Wells producing the track.

The full version of the King/ Goffin duet of "Where You Lead" had its debut release on the 2002 album Our Little Corner of the World: Music from Gilmore Girls and would be a bonus track on the 2007 deluxe edition release of King's album Love Makes the World, while King and Goffin could be heard singing the song live on King's 2005 concert album The Living Room Tour: in its album appearances the track's title shows as "Where You Lead I Will Follow" although the Gilmore Girls credits identified the song as "Where You Lead". During the 2010 Troubadour Reunion Tour King performed the revised version of "Where You Lead" at some tour venues, singing lead while the tour's co-headliner James Taylor played guitar and sang background vocals.

King and Goffin also dueted on the revised version of "Where You Lead" at King's 3 July 2016 Hyde Park concert which marked the first time King had performed all the songs from Tapestry in a single concert. King addressed her choice to sing the latterday version of "Where You Lead" at Hyde Park with the introductory comments: "The next song I don’t perform very much. It came out just before women’s lib, and it’s got kind of a 'Stand by Your Man' lyric so I [soon] didn't exactly feel comfortable performing it", with King then explaining how the song came to be the Gilmore Girls theme.

That version was sung by the title character on the penultimate episode of the NBC show Ordinary Joe, accompanied by his son, a children's choir, and his mother.

Other versions
"Where You Lead" was also recorded by Kate Taylor being featured on her 1971 album Sister Kate. The track featured Carole King on piano (King's husband Charles Larkey also played bass) while the chorale included King and Oma Drake, who was a chorale member on the Barbra Joan Streisand version. Despite these shared elements, AllMusic critic Joe Viglione credited Taylor's version with a "totally different flavor" from those of both King and Streisand. The Sonny and Cher concert album Live in Las Vegas Vol 2 (1973) featured "Where You Lead" in a medley with "I Can See Clearly Now" and "You've Got a Friend". Versions of "Where You Lead" have also been recorded by Liz Damon's Orient Express (album Try a Little Tenderness/ 1971), Iris Williams (album The Many Moods of Iris Williams/ 1976), Faith Hill (multi-artist album Tapestry Revisited: a tribute to Carole King/ 1995), Barbara Higbie (album Barbara Higbie's Interpretation of Carole King/ 1999), and Marcia Hines (album Marcia Sings Tapestry and the Songs of Carole King/ 2010).

References

1970 songs
Songs written by Carole King
Carole King songs
Barbra Streisand songs
Austin Roberts (singer) songs
Song recordings produced by Lou Adler
Songs written by Toni Stern
Song recordings produced by Richard Perry
Gilmore Girls
Comedy television theme songs